North Gypsum Creek Truss Leg Bedstead Bridge (59-LT-22) is an historic bridge in McPherson County, Roxbury, Kansas.

The bridge was built in 1902 and added to the National Historic Register in 2003.

References

External links
 

Road bridges on the National Register of Historic Places in Kansas
Buildings and structures in McPherson County, Kansas
National Register of Historic Places in McPherson County, Kansas
Bedstead truss bridges